Dongmyo (which literally means "Eastern Shrine") is a shrine in metropolitan Seoul built in honour of the 3rd century Chinese military commander, Guan Yu.

The Joseon government embarked on construction in 1599 and completed the work in 1601. The Wanli Emperor of Ming provided funds for construction of the shrine, along with a plaque with his own calligraphy. Three shrines - Dongmyo (east shrine), Seomyo (west shrine) and Bungmyo (north shrine) - were actually constructed in 1601. However, only Dongmyo Shrine remains today.

There was no such practice as worshipping Guan Yu as a Marshal Deity in Korea until Ming dynasty military officers brought the custom during the military campaigns against Japan. As Neo-Confucian fundamentalists, Korean officers found it unacceptable to worship Guan Yu, but were unable to refuse the Chinese request for enshrinement. The construction was a burden to exhausted postwar Korea and the shrine was maintained only with concern for the relationship with China.

Koreans remained indifferent toward these shrines for a long time. But during the reign of King Yeongjo (1724-1776), Dongmyo and Nammyo (another shrine constructed by Ming military official Zhen Yin) were incorporated into state rituals for the purpose of Ming worship linked with hostility toward and contempt for Manchu Qing dynasty.

The shrine is surrounded by a wall of stone and mud, and covers an area of 9,315 m2. Ceremonies were held here for many years to thank Guan Yu for divine support. The shrine compound is enclosed on all sides by walls. Two figures to the rear of the compound are of the general while other figures are images of retainers and other generals. The figure with a red face is the general's earthly countenance and the one with a yellow face, his spirit.

The shrine, following the Chinese model, is narrower in width than depth, and the rear and side walls are sumptuously decorated with bricks. Inside the main shrine a wooden image of Guan Yu is enshrined, along with statues of four of his retainers.

A nearby station on Line 1 and Line 6 of the Seoul Subway is named after shrine. The shrine is located in Jongno-gu.

Gallery

Notes

References
 Kuwano Eiji 桑野栄治, Chōsen kōki ni okeru kokka saishi girei no hendō 朝鮮後期における国家祭祀儀礼の変動, Kurume Daigaku Kiyō: Kokusai Bunka gakka hen 久留米大学文学部紀要 国際文化学科編, Vol. 23, pp. 31–53. 2006.

See also
History of Korea
Korean architecture

Jongno District
17th-century establishments in Korea
1601 establishments in Asia
Buildings and structures in Seoul
Religion in Seoul
Tourist attractions in Seoul
Guandi temples